Altipolia is a genus of moths of the family Noctuidae. The genus was erected by Jacques Plante in 1985.

Species
Altipolia illecebrosa (Püngeler, 1906) Nepal, Qinghai, Sichuan
Altipolia sonamargensis Plante, 1985 Kashmir
Altipolia gengda Benedek & Saldaitis, 2014 Sichuan
Altipolia plantei Hacker & Peks, 1993 Nepal, India (Himachal Pradesh)
Altipolia purpurea Plante, 1985 Nepal
Altipolia griseana Hreblay & Plante, 1995 Nepal
Altipolia ganeshgurungi Hreblay & Ronkay, 1998 Nepal

References

Cuculliinae
Noctuoidea genera